Crouch Hill railway station is a London Overground station on Crouch Hill in the London Borough of Islington, north London.

The National Location Code (NLC) for this station is 7406.

Design
The station has two platforms, one for each direction. Platform 1 is for trains toward  and platform 2 is for trains toward . This station does not have a ticket office except for the security office, which is not officially part of the station but is next to the stairs to one of the platforms. However, staff are present on the platforms during the hours trains are running. This station has two ticket and two Oyster card machines; one for each platform as well as two waiting rooms. This station has a shelter on each platform. The platforms are only reachable by stairs.

There are no current plans to introduce lift access. The station was briefly equipped with APTIS ticketing equipment in 1988–89.

Services
Trains run every 15 minutes in each direction, towards either  or  throughout the day. All trains from the station are operated by London Overground.
The typical off-peak service in trains per hour (tph) is:
4 tph westbound to Gospel Oak
4 tph eastbound to Barking Riverside

Weekday trains resumed from February 2017.

Connections
Whilst the station has no direct interchange to a tube station,  station is a fifteen-minute walk away along Stroud Green Road. Archway tube station is also a twenty-minute walk away.

London Buses routes 210 and W7 serve the station.

References

External links

Railway stations in the London Borough of Islington
DfT Category E stations
Former Tottenham and Hampstead Junction Railway stations
Railway stations in Great Britain opened in 1868
Railway stations served by London Overground